Chef-du-Pont is a former commune in the Manche department in Normandy in north-western France. On 1 January 2016, it was merged into the commune of Sainte-Mère-Église.

During World War 2, as part of the opening phase of Operation Overlord, due to the crossing point on the Merderet River, Chef-du-Pont was a priority objective of the Allies.  The objective was part of the 82nd Airborne Mission Boston parachute assault.

See also
Communes of the Manche department

References 

Chefdupont